State Route 261 (SR 261) is an east–west state highway located in northeastern Ohio that passes through Medina, Summit, and Portage counties.

State Route 261's routing is more complicated than other state highways, frequently changing streets and direction. It runs through downtown Akron as two sets of one-way surface streets. It has a divided highway section from the outskirts of southern Kent to just east of SR 43. This divided section was originally planned to be limited access and tie in with another highway, SR 435, but this plan was never implemented.

History
SR 261 was commissioned in 1927 between SR 18, in Tallmadge, and Kent. In 1930 the highway was extended southwest to SR 8 in Akron. The route was extended west to Wadsworth, in 1937. The southeast section of the Kent bypass, between SR 43 and SR 59 opened between 1969 and 1971, with SR 261 be rerouted onto it then. The bypass  of Kent west of SR 43 was completed in 1972, with SR 261 being rerouted onto that section then. In 1983 the highway was rerouted towards the northwest in the City of Akron.

Major intersections

References

External links

261
Transportation in Medina County, Ohio
Transportation in Portage County, Ohio
Transportation in Summit County, Ohio
Transportation in Akron, Ohio